Galium lucidum is a species of plants in the Rubiaceae. It is native to the Mediterranean region, from Portugal and Morocco to Greece, the range extending northwards into Germany.

Galium lucidum is an erect, perennial, glabrous plant up to 70 cm tall. Leaves are narrow and linear, up to 3 cm long, whorled with as many as 10 per node. Inflorescence is a large terminal panicle of many small, white to cream-colored flowers.

Subspecies
Five subspecies are currently recognized (May 2014):

Galium lucidum subsp. fruticescens (Cav.) O.Bolòs & Vigo - Spain
Galium lucidum subsp. krendlii Natali - Corsica
Galium lucidum subsp. lucidum - most of species range
Galium lucidum subsp. krendlii Natali - Corsica
Galium lucidum subsp. venustum (Jord.) Arcang  - Corsica, Sicily, Sardinia, central Italy

References

External links
Tela Botanica, Gaillet luisant
Flore Alpes, Gaillet à feuilles luisantes
Comune di Pontassieve, Guida alla Flora Spontanea, Galium lucidum All. subsp. lucidum (Caglio lucido) 

lucidum
Flora of Portugal
Flora of Tunisia
Flora of Morocco
Flora of Spain
Flora of Germany
Flora of Corsica
Flora of France
Flora of Switzerland
Flora of Greece
Flora of Croatia
Flora of Serbia
Flora of Austria
Flora of Romania
Flora of Bulgaria
Flora of Slovakia
Flora of Slovenia
Flora of Kosovo
Flora of Sicily
Flora of Sardinia
Flora of Italy
Plants described in 1773
Taxa named by Carlo Allioni